The middleweight class in the boxing at the 1964 Summer Olympics competition was the third-heaviest class.  Middleweights were limited to those boxers weighing less than 75 kilograms. 20 boxers from 20 nations competed.

Medalists

Results

References

Sources

M